The 10th Magritte Awards ceremony, presented by the Académie André Delvaux, honored the best films of 2019 in Belgium. It took place on 1 February 2020, at the Square, in the historic site of Mont des Arts, Brussels. During the ceremony, the Académie André Delvaux presented Magritte Awards in 22 categories. The ceremony was televised in Belgium by La Deux. Actor Pascal Duquenne presided the ceremony, while comedian Kody hosted the show for the first time.

The nominees for the 10th Magritte Awards were announced on 8 January 2020. Films with the most nominations were Mothers' Instinct with ten, followed by Young Ahmed with nine and Lola with seven. The winners were announced during the awards ceremony on 1 February 2020. Mothers' Instinct won a record-breaking nine awards, including Best Film and Best Director for Olivier Masset-Depasse. Other multiple winners were Lola and Young Ahmed with two awards each.

Winners and nominees

Best Film
 Mothers' Instinct (Duelles) Alone at My Wedding (Seule à mon mariage)
 Lola (Lola vers la mer)
 Our Mothers (Nuestras madres)
 Young Ahmed (Le Jeune Ahmed)

Best Director
 Olivier Masset-Depasse – Mothers' Instinct (Duelles) Jean-Pierre and Luc Dardenne – Young Ahmed (Le Jeune Ahmed)
 César Díaz – Our Mothers (Nuestras madres)
 Laurent Micheli – Lola (Lola vers la mer)

Best Actor
 Bouli Lanners – Real Love (C'est ça l'amour) Kevin Janssens –  Patrick (De Patrick)
 Benoît Poelvoorde – Sink or Swim (Le Grand Bain)
 Marc Zinga – The Mercy of the Jungle (La Miséricorde de la Jungle)

Best Actress
 Veerle Baetens – Mothers' Instinct (Duelles) Lubna Azabal – Tel Aviv on Fire
 Anne Coesens – Mothers' Instinct (Duelles)
 Cécile de France – A Bigger World (Un monde plus grand)

Best Supporting Actor
 Arieh Worthalter – Mothers' Instinct (Duelles) Othmane Moumen – Young Ahmed (Le Jeune Ahmed)
 Bouli Lanners – Patrick (De Patrick)
 Jonathan Zaccaï – Sink or Swim (Le Grand Bain)

Best Supporting Actress
 Myriem Akheddiou – Young Ahmed (Le Jeune Ahmed) Claire Bodson – Young Ahmed (Le Jeune Ahmed)
 Stéphanie Crayencour – Emma Peeters
 Yolande Moreau – Cleo

Most Promising Actor
 Idir Ben Addi – Young Ahmed (Le Jeune Ahmed) Baloji – Binti
 François Neycken – Escapada
 Jeremy Senez – Three Days and a Life (Trois jours et une vie)

Most Promising Actress
 Mya Bollaers – Lola (Lola vers la mer) Bebel Tshiani Baloji – Binti
 Victoria Bluck – Young Ahmed (Le Jeune Ahmed)
 Raphaëlle Corbisier – Escapada

Best Screenplay
 Mothers' Instinct (Duelles) – Olivier Masset-Depasse Lola (Lola vers la mer) – Laurent Micheli
 Our Mothers (Nuestras madres) – César Díaz
 Young Ahmed (Le Jeune Ahmed) – Jean-Pierre and Luc Dardenne

Best First Feature Film
 Our Mothers (Nuestras madres) Alone at My Wedding (Seule à mon mariage)
 Escapada
 For a Happy Life (Pour vivre heureux)
 Girls on the Run (Cavale)

Best Flemish Film
 Patrick (De Patrick) Bastaard
 Binti
 Cleo

Best Foreign Film in Coproduction
 Sorry We Missed You
 Atlantics (Atlantique)
 The Sisters Brothers
 Tel Aviv on Fire

Best Cinematography
 Mothers' Instinct (Duelles) – Hichame Alaouié
 Our Mothers (Nuestras madres) – Virginie Surdej
 The Sisters Brothers – Benoît Debie

Best Production Design
 Lola (Lola vers la mer) – Catherine Cosme
 Patrick (De Patrick) – Hubert Pouille and Pepijn Van Looy
 The Room – Françoise Joset

Best Costume Design
 Alone at My Wedding (Seule à mon mariage) – Claudine Tychon
 Emma Peeters – Gaëlle Fierens
 Patrick (De Patrick) – Valérie Le Roy

Best Original Score
 Mothers' Instinct (Duelles) – Frédéric Vercheval
 Binti – Fabien Leclercq
 Girls on the Run (Cavale) – Dan Klein
 Lola (Lola vers la mer) – Raf Keunen

Best Sound
 Mothers' Instinct (Duelles) – Olivier Struye, Marc Bastien, Héléna Réveillère, Thomas Gauder
 Atlantics (Atlantique) – Benoît De Clerck, Emmanuel de Boissieu, Claude Gillet
 Our Mothers (Nuestras madres) – Emmanuel de Boissieu and Vincent Nouaille

Best Editing
 Mothers' Instinct (Duelles) – Damien Keyeux
 Lola (Lola vers la mer) – Julie Naas
 Young Ahmed (Le Jeune Ahmed) – Marie-Hélène Dozo

Best Live Action Short Film
 Matriochkas – Bérangère McNeese
 Bruxelles–Beyrouth – Thibaut Wohlfahrt and Samir Youssef
 Detours – Christopher Yates
 Lucia en el limbo – Valentina Maurel

Best Animated Short Film
 The County Fair (La Foire agricole) – Vincent Patar and Stéphane Aubier
 Big Wolf & Little Wolf (Grand Loup & Petit Loup) – Rémi Durin
 Sweet Night (Nuit chérie) – Marine Jacob
 Under the Rib Cage (Sous le cartilage des côtes) – Bruno Tondeur

Best Documentary Film
 My Name Is Clitoris (Mon nom est Clitoris) – Daphné Leblond and Lisa Billuart Monet
 Bains Publics – Kita Bauchet
 By the Name of Tania – Mary Jiménez and Bénédicte Liénard 
 That Which Does Not Kill (Sans frapper) – Alexe Poukine

Honorary Magritte Award
 Monica Bellucci

Films with multiple nominations and awards

The following fifteen films received multiple nominations.
 Ten: Mothers' Instinct
 Nine: Young Ahmed
 Seven: Lola
 Six: Our Mothers
 Five: Patrick
 Four: Binti
 Three: Alone at My Wedding, Escapada
 Two: Atlantics, Cleo, Emma Peeters, Girls on the Run, Sink or Swim, The Sisters Brothers, Tel Aviv on Fire

The following three films received multiple awards.
 Nine: Mothers' Instinct
 Two: Lola, Young Ahmed

See also

 2019 in film
 45th César Awards
 25th Lumières Awards

References

External links
 
 

2020
2019 film awards
2020 in Belgium